James Norton (27 July 179531 August 1862) was a solicitor and public figure in early colonial New South Wales. Admitted to practise in England, he arrived in Sydney in September 1818 where only four other attorneys were then practising. He was the founder of the first law firm in Sydney. He was a member of the first Legislative Council under responsible government in New South Wales in 1856, and drafted numerous laws. He held land at Mulgoa which was farmed and owned Elswick, a 30 ha estate in what is now Leichhardt where he grew prize flowers and plants. He was a leading Sydney member of the Anti-Transportation League and a protectionist in whose cause he published a series of pamphlets.

From Sussex to Sydney 
James Norton was born on 27 July 1795 in Hastings, Sussex, England. After legal training, he was admitted as an attorney. Signing on as captain's clerk, he arrived at Port Jackson in September 1818 per the Maria with capital of £800. He joined a small legal profession in Sydney: the list of the attorneys of the colony in the New South Wales Pocket Almanac for 1819 read "Thomas Wylde Esq, W H Moore Esq, Frederic Garling Esq, T S Amos Esq, and James Norton Esq."

Mulgoa farmer 
His father, John, a brother, Nathathiel, and three sisters joined him in Sydney. On 6 April 1821, three large land grants were made at Mulgoa to the Norton family: John Norton was granted  which he called Goves; Nathaniel Norton, Fairlight; and James Norton, Northend which he farmed. His youngest sister, Emma (1798–1885), married the explorer John Oxley in August 1822.

Legal practice 
Norton created Australia's first law firm in 1826 when he formed the partnership, Norton and Barker with William Barker. Before the legal profession in New South Wales was divided in 1829, he appeared as counsel for the Crown in a number of significant cases. His son, James Norton Jr. was articled in the same law firm.

Honours and awards 
The main street of Leichhardt is named in his honour. The 30 hectare Elswick estate was bounded by Parramatta Road, Norton Street, Marion Street and Elswick Street, Leichhardt; in 1882, it was sub-divided and offered as 600 lots.

Publications 
 Essays and reflections in Australia, (using pseudonym "a layman"), 1852–1853
 The constitution question, 1853
 Port Jackson and the City of Sydney, 1853
 Further observations on the resurrection of the body, (using pseudonym "a layman"), 1854
 Australian essays on subjects political, moral, and religious, 1857
 Free trade and protection, 1857
 Facts for the protectionists, 1857
 The condition of the colony of New South Wales, 1860

Notes and references

Further reading 
 The Nortons of Sussex and New South Wales (Sydney, R.E.H. James, printer, 1912)
 A. Halloran, "Some Early Legal Celebrities" (1924) Journal and Proceedings (Royal Australian Historical Society), Vol 10, no. 6, pp 301–47.

19th-century Australian lawyers
Australian solicitors
English emigrants to colonial Australia
Members of the New South Wales Legislative Council
1795 births
1862 deaths
19th-century Australian politicians